Rachid Adghigh (born 1 July 1961) is an Algerian footballer. He played in 22 matches for the Algeria national football team from 1984 to 1990. He was also named in Algeria's squad for the 1990 African Cup of Nations tournament.

References

External links
 

1961 births
Living people
Algerian footballers
Algeria international footballers
1990 African Cup of Nations players
Africa Cup of Nations-winning players
Association football defenders
21st-century Algerian people
JS Kabylie players
Al Tarsana SC players
Algerian expatriate footballers
Expatriate footballers in Libya